Bo van der Werff (born 24 August 1992 in Eelde) is a Dutch long track speed skater, who prefers short and middle distances. She won a gold medal in the 1000 meters at the Dutch Junior speed skating championship in 2010. In the 2011–2012 season, she was contracted to the speed skating team Team Anker. She later joined the iSkate Development Team.

Records

Personal records

References

Living people
Dutch female speed skaters
People from Tynaarlo
1992 births
21st-century Dutch women
Sportspeople from Drenthe